James Francis Pendergast (January 27, 1856 – November 10, 1911) was a Democratic politician and the first Big City Boss of Kansas City, Missouri. He was the elder brother of Thomas J. Pendergast and Michael J. Pendergast.

Early life
Pendergast was born on January 27, 1856, in Gallipolis, Ohio to Michael and Mary Pendergast. His family moved to St. Joseph, Missouri in 1859. He was educated at the public schools there. In 1876, Pendergast moved to Kansas City in 1876. Pendergast worked in packing houses and then worked at the Jarboe Foundry. After winning a horse race on a long shot, "Climax," he opened a saloon named after the horse in the West Bottoms. In 1880, he opened a boarding house at 1320-1322 St. Louis Avenue in Kansas City called the old American House. He ran the boarding house for about 31 years.

Career
In 1884, he was elected as a delegate to represent the sixth ward in the Democratic City Convention. In 1887, he became the Democratic committeeman from the first ward. He was elected alderman in 1892. Known as "Alderman Jim" and "Big Jim," he achieved political power by doing favors. He remained in that role until 1910.

His chief political rival was Joe Shannon. Pendergast's faction was called the "goats" because it wanted to climb out of the river bottoms, but Shannon's faction was the "rabbits" because its power base was in the river bottom.

Personal life
Pendergast married Mary Kline in 1886. She died in 1905.

Pendergast died on November 10, 1911, at the home of his sister in Kansas City. He was buried at Mount Saint Mary's Cemetery in Kansas City.

Legacy

After Pendergast's death, a statue of him was placed in Mulkey Square overlooking the West Bottoms. It is now in Case Park on Quality Hill.

References

James Francis Pendergast Biography at Kansas City Public Library

External links

James Pendergast in the News (Kansas City Journal)
the Climax saloon, and rise to power

1856 births
1911 deaths
People from Gallipolis, Ohio
Missouri Democrats
Missouri city council members
 
19th-century American politicians
20th-century American politicians